The Dr. Samuel D. Mercer House was built in 1885 in the historic Walnut Hill neighborhood of Omaha, Nebraska, United States.  Samuel Mercer was the chief surgeon of the Union Pacific Railroad, and the founder of Omaha's first hospital.

A grand 23-room red brick mansion built in the Queen Anne style, the key feature of the home is a three-story square tower that rises above the south side main entrance.  The cost of the structure was $60,000.   The home is the crown jewel of the neighborhood Mercer platted in the 1880s. In the 1880s the city's cable cars stopped at the Mercer House.  The house has been subdivided into apartments and much of the elaborate Victorian trim was removed in 1926.   The house was listed on the National Register of Historic Places in 1976.

See also
History of North Omaha, Nebraska
Architecture of North Omaha, Nebraska

References

History of North Omaha, Nebraska
Houses on the National Register of Historic Places in Omaha, Nebraska
Landmarks in North Omaha, Nebraska
Queen Anne architecture in Nebraska